Luis Antonio Martínez Mateo (born 4 July 1997), sportingly known as Junior, is a Spanish-born Dominican footballer who plays as a midfielder for Segunda División RFEF club UP Langreo and the Dominican Republic national team.

International career
Junior made his debut for Dominican Republic on 24 March 2019.

References

External links

1997 births
Living people
Citizens of the Dominican Republic through descent
Dominican Republic footballers
Association football midfielders
Dominican Republic international footballers
Dominican Republic people of Spanish descent
Sportspeople of Spanish descent
Footballers from Madrid
Spanish footballers
CD Leganés B players
Unionistas de Salamanca CF players
Arenas Club de Getxo footballers
Internacional de Madrid players
Real Murcia players
UP Langreo footballers
Segunda División B players
Tercera División players
Segunda Federación players
Spanish people of Dominican Republic descent
Sportspeople of Dominican Republic descent